Rolf Axel "Acke" Ejnar Grönberg (9 May 1918 – 23 April 1988) was a Swedish wrestler, who won the Greco-Roman middleweight division at the 1948 and 1952 Summer Olympics.

Grönberg was raised in Norberg, but moved to Stockholm as a teenager. There he worked as a plumber and masseur, and started wrestling following his elder brothers Fritz and Harald. Besides his Olympic medals he won a world title in 1950, three European Championship medals, as well as 16 national titles between 1944 and 1958.

References

1918 births
1988 deaths
Olympic wrestlers of Sweden
Wrestlers at the 1948 Summer Olympics
Wrestlers at the 1952 Summer Olympics
Swedish male sport wrestlers
Olympic gold medalists for Sweden
Olympic medalists in wrestling
World Wrestling Championships medalists
Medalists at the 1952 Summer Olympics
Medalists at the 1948 Summer Olympics
European Wrestling Championships medalists
20th-century Swedish people